Soleyman Kandi (also Romanized as Soleymān Kandī; also known as Qezeljeh Qal‘eh) is a village in Qarah Quyun-e Shomali Rural District, in the Central District of Showt County, West Azerbaijan Province, Iran. At the 2006 census, its population was 542, in 111 families.

References 

Populated places in Showt County